Nala Damayanthi is a 2003 Indian Tamil-language comedy film directed by Mouli, written and produced by Kamal Haasan. The film stars R. Madhavan in the lead role, with Geetu Mohandas and Shrutika playing supporting roles. The film follows the story of a naive Tamil cook stuck in Australia. It was released on 12 June 2003 to positive reviews. Madhavan, later remade in Hindi-language as Ramji Londonwaley in 2005.

Plot 
Ramji Narayanaswami Iyer, a naive and docile Tamil Brahmin cook, dreams of marrying off his sister Bhagyam to a good family, as they are orphans and it becomes his sole responsibility. As per convention, he has shell out dowry for the marriage and somehow falls short of the agreed sum. Incidentally, the groom's family happens to admire the food cooked by Ramji and plans him to send to Melbourne, Australia as a cook for a multimillionaire Australian-based Indian family. In return, he has to send part of his salary as compensation for the dowry he owes.

The millionaire dies of indigestion the day Ramji arrives, leaving him jobless and without his passport and visa, which had been stolen. Desperate to stay and earn, he starts working illegally as a cook in an Indian hotel owned by an NRI Badri, but to stay on, he needs to get a legal work permit as the immigration police are on his heels. Ivan, Badri's cunning lawyer friend, explains to him that the only way out is marriage with an Australian citizen. Ramji reluctantly agrees for a fake marriage with Ivan's fiancé Damayanthi, a free-spirited motorbiker of Sri Lankan Tamil Christian background, and they get married over the weekend. For all these gimmicks, Ivan charges heavy fees from Badri and deposits in the joint account of his with Damayanthi. Ramji converts to Christianity, becoming Robert, and then moves into Damayanthi's house.

The police believes this is a fake marriage and decides to refer the matter to the consulate. Constant stalking by the police forces the couple to stay together to avoid detection by authority. Damayanthi is deeply troubled with the rural mannerisms of Ramji. To break the ice, Ramji cooks delicacies for Damayanthi and wins her heart. Over a period of time, Damayanthi realises that Ivan is fooling around with her and does not love her.

Meanwhile, Ramji is not able to send the dowry installments as promised and his sister's in-laws throw her out. Damayanthi handles this situation smartly, sends all the money received for the fake marriage in their joint account to her, and makes sure her long-time friend takes care of her. In their confrontation with the consulate, Ramji answers more than he is asked at the immigration office then is forced to return to India. Damayanthi eventually comes along to Palakkad and the film ends with a happy note where couple starts off a restaurant. Actors Kamal Haasan and Jayaram come to inaugurate their restaurant and wish the couple luck.

Cast

Production 
Kamal Haasan had written the script with himself in mind to play the lead role in the late 1990s, but never got down to making it because he felt it would not have been cost-effective. Through the project, he had aimed to reprise his character of the Palakkad Brahmin cook Kameshwaran from Michael Madana Kama Rajan (1990) and place him in funny situations occurring in a foreign country. He had briefly considered making the film in early 1999 with the title of Londonil Kameshwaran after Marudhanayagam had run into production troubles, but instead chose to prioritise his commitments for Hey Ram (2000). After the profitable Pammal K. Sambandam (2002), Mouli asked Kamal Haasan to re-collaborate with this particular script but Kamal Haasan was uninterested. R. Madhavan was selected by Kamal Haasan to replace him, after the pair had shot for Anbe Sivam together in the period. Geetu Mohandas was signed in February 2003 after Mouli had seen her picture in a magazine, and thus she made her comeback to the Tamil film industry after having appeared as the child in the 1988 film, En Bommukutty Ammavukku. While casting for the role of the lead actress, the makers had made several broadcasts over Radio Australia without success. Mouli had been insistent on casting a new actress in Tamil and subsequently considered Malayalam actresses Kavya Madhavan and Navya Nair before finalising Mohandas. The actress was also recommended to the team by actor Jayaram. Bruno Xavier, an Australia-based Sri Lankan Tamil actor, was selected to play the antagonist's role after a successful audition.

The film was shot predominantly in Sydney & Melbourne, Australia in February and March 2003 to make most of the daylight hours. Anu Hasan, daughter of producer Chandra Haasan, helped with production duties and cut costs of the team's shoot in Australia, as well leading post-production works while also provided voice for the film's lead actress Geethu.

Soundtrack 

The film's music was composed by Ramesh Vinayakam, which is his third Tamil project he signed. Actor Kamal Haasan sang an English folk song, titled "Stranded On The Streets", which was written by Pradeep Govind, and also contained the Tamil version of the song "Sudupattadha". The remaining songs were written by Vaali and Na. Muthukumar.

The soundtrack for the film was released on 10 May 2003. The album got positive reviews with the songs "Stranded On The Streets" and "Enna Ithu".

Release 
The film was a  success at the box office and performed well in multiplexes across Chennai. Sify gave a verdict that the film was a "comedy caper" and a "clean comedy with some warm moments". The Hindu called the film a "decent offering", adding that "a logical storyline and a well thought out script by Kamal Hassan are definite scoring points that sustain viewers' interest till the end".

Kamal Haasan stated that he intended of remaking the film in Hindi, with the title of Maharaj, but the project did not take off. Madhavan later wrote and starred in a Hindi version, Ramji Londonwaley, which released in September 2005.

References

External links 
 

2003 films
2003 romantic comedy films
Films about immigration
Films shot in Melbourne
Indian romantic comedy films
2000s Tamil-language films
Films with screenplays by Kamal Haasan
Tamil films remade in other languages
Films scored by Ramesh Vinayakam
Films set in Melbourne
Films directed by T. S. B. K. Moulee